Sheldon is a rural residential locality in the City of Redland, Queensland, Australia.

Geography 

The suburb is sparsely populated, consisting of mostly bushland, including some residential properties on acreage. The presence of multiple protected areas is notable, preserving the region's natural eucalyptus forests, and protecting endangered species such as the koala.

Tingalpa Creek flows through the western edge of the suburb, forming a border between the City of Brisbane. Since Tingalpa Creek's headwaters are located in the Sheldon region, the suburb is a catchment area for the entire Leslie Harrison Dam, which provides drinking water to much of the Redlands.

The region is also home to a significant koala population. As a result, the suburb retains much of its natural bushland, extending north from the Venman Bushland National Park in Mount Cotton. Nature areas of Sheldon include:

Brisbane Koala Bushlands
Emu Street Bushland Reserve
Ford Road Conservation Area
Summit Street Reserve

History
Previously a largely uninhabited rural area, the suburb of Sheldon was officially named in 1980. It combined the southern and northern portions of neighbouring suburbs Capalaba and Mount Cotton, respectively.
The Sheldon name likely originated from the village of the same name in Devon, United Kingdom, which itself came from an Old English word meaning "steep-sided hill and wooden valley".

Sheldon College opened on 1997 near the roundabout at which Sheldon, Capalaba, Alexandra Hills, and Thornlands meet at a quadripoint. 

In the 2011 census, the population of Sheldon was 1,690, of which 49.5% were female and 50.5% were male. The median age of the Sheldon population was 42 years, 5 years above the national median of 37. 80.5% of people living in Sheldon were born in Australia. The other top responses for country of birth were England (7%), New Zealand (2.6%), South Africa (1%,) Scotland (0.8%), and India (0.5%). 94.5% of people speak English as their first language, while some residents speak German (0.6%), Spanish (0.5%), Serbian (0.4%), Italian (0.4%), and Greek (0.4%).

Economy 
Karreman Quarries are based in Sheldon, operating a quarry in the suburb, which provides material for road surfacing.

ABeeC Hives - Stingless Australian Native Bee Hives are based in Sheldon, manufacturing beehives for Tetragonula carbonaria and Tetragonula hockingsi.

Education 

Sheldon College is a private primary and secondary (Prep-12) school for boys and girls at Lot 5 Taylor Road. In 2017, the school had an enrolment of 1,367 students with 110 teachers (99 full-time equivalent) and 85 non-teaching staff (74 full-time equivalent).

There are no government schools in Sheldon. The nearest government primary schools are Coolnwypin State School in Capalaba, Hilliard State School in Alexandra Hills, Bay View State School in Thornlands, Mount Cotton State School in Mount Cotton, Rochedale South State School in Rochedale South and Capalaba State College in Capalaba. The nearest government secondary schools are Capalaba State College in Capalaba, Cleveland District State High School in Cleveland and Rochedale State High School in Rochedale.

References

External links
 
 Community Profile: Sheldon
 Redlands Disaster Plan: Sheldon - About

Suburbs of Redland City
Localities in Queensland